Jan B. Talbot is an American chemical engineer. She is a professor emerita at the Jacobs School of Engineering. She completed a bachelor and master of science in chemical engineering at Pennsylvania State University. From 1975 to 1981, Talbot was as a development engineer at Oak Ridge National Laboratory. She completed a Ph.D. in chemical engineering and materials science in 1986 from University of Minnesota. She joined the faculty at University of California, San Diego in 1986. She was the president of the Electrochemical Society from 2001 to 2002. In 2004, she became a fellow of the Electrochemical Society.

Publications 

 Lee, J. and J. B. Talbot, “Simulation of Particle Incorporation during Electrodeposition Process: Primary and Secondary Current Distributions,” Journal of The Electrochemical Society, 152  (10), C706-C715 (2005).
 Hurt, M., and J. B. Talbot “A Dry Phosphor Screening Method for Emissive Displays Using a Tacky Photopolymer,” Journal of The Electrochemical Society, 152  (11), H178-H182 (2005).
 Sweet, W.S., J. B. Talbot, and R. Higgins, Electrophoretic Deposition of Zeolite 5A for Use in Supported Gas Separation Membranes," Key Engineering Materials, 314, 39-44 (2006).
 Swei, J. and J. B. Talbot, "Development of High-Definition Aqueous Polyvinylpyrrolidone (PVP) Photoresists for CRTs, " Journal of Applied Polymer Science,  102 (2), 1637-1644 (2006).
 Ye, X. R., C. Daraio, C. Wang, J. B. Talbot, and S. Jin, “Room Temperature Solvent-Free Synthesis of Monodisperse Magnetite Nanocrystals,” J. Nanosci. Nanotechnol. 6, 852-856 (2006).
 Gopal. T. and J. B. Talbot, “Effects of CMP Slurry Chemistry on the Zeta Potential of Alumina Abrasives,"  Journal of The Electrochemical Society, 153, G622 (2006).
 Inhfeldt, R and J.B. Talbot, “Effects of Copper CMP Slurry Chemistry on the Colloidal Behavior of Alumina Abrasives,"  Journal of The Electrochemical Society, 153, G948  (2006).
 B. Han, K. Mishra, M. Raukas, K. Klinedinst, J. Tao, and J.B. Talbot, “Investigation of Luminescence from Dy3+ in AlN,” Journal of The Electrochemical Society, 154 (1), J44 –J52, 2007.
 J. Lee, and J. B. Talbot, “A Model of Electrocodeposition on a Rotating Cylinder Electrode," Journal of The Electrochemical Society, 154 (2), D70-D77, 2007.
 T. Gopal, and J. B. Talbot, “Use of Slurry Colloidal Behavior in Modeling of Material Removal Rates for CMP,” Journal of The Electrochemical Society, 154 (6), H507-H511, 2007.
 S. Quale, and J. B. Talbot, “Electrophoretic Deposition of Substrate-Normal-Oriented Single-Walled Carbon Nanotube Structures”, Journal of The Electrochemical Society, 154 (8), K25-K28, 2007, also June 11, 2007 issue of Virtual Journal of Nanoscale Science & Technology.
 S. J. Osborne, W. S. Sweet, K. S. Vecchio, and J. B. Talbot, “Electroplating of Copper-Alumina Nanocomposite Films with an Impinging Jet Electrode,” Journal of The Electrochemical Society, 154 (8), D394-D399, 2007; also June 25, 2007 issue of Virtual Journal of Nanoscale Science & Technology.
 B. Han, M. Raukas, K. Klinedinst, J. Tao, J. B. Talbot, and K. Mishra, “A Study of Luminescence from Tm3+, Tb3+ and Eu3+ in AlN Powder,” Journal of The Electrochemical Society,   154 (9), J262 –J266, 2007.
 D. Thiemig, J. B. Talbot and A. Bund, “Electrocodeposition of Nickel Nanocomposites using an Impinging Jet Electrode", Journal of The Electrochemical Society, 154 (10), D510-515, 2007.  
 R. Inhfeldt and J.B. Talbot, “Modeling of Copper CMP Using the Colloidal Behavior of an Alumina Slurry with Copper Nanoparticles,” Journal of The Electrochemical Society, 154 (12), H1018-H1026 (2007).
 N. Perea-Lopez,  J. H. Tao, J. McKittrick, J. B. Talbot, M. Raukas, J. Laski, K. C. Mishra, and G. Hirata,  “Eu3+ Activated GaN Thin Films Grown on Sapphire by Pulsed Laser Deposition,” Physica Status Solidi C, 5, No. 6, 1756–1758 (2008).5, No. 6, 1756–1758 (20085, No. 6, 1756–1758 (2008).
 J. H. Tao, N. Perea-Lopez, J. McKittrick, J. B. Talbot, K. Klinedinst, M. Raukas, J. Laski, K. C. Mishra, and G. Hirata, “Synthesis of Rare-earth Activated AlN and GaN Powders Via a Three-step Conversion Process,”  Physica Status Solidi C, 5, No. 6, 1889–1891 (2008).
 J. Tao, N. Perea-Lopez, J. McKittrick, J. B. Talbot, B. Han, M. Raukas, K. Klinedinst, and K. Mishra,  “A Study of Oxygen Content in GaN, AlN, and GaAlN Powders," J. Electrochem. Soc., 155 (6), J137-J142 (2008).   
 R. Ihnfeldt and J. B. Talbot, “Effect of CMP Slurry Chemistry on Copper Surface Nanohardness”, J. Electrochem. Soc., 155 (6), H412-H420 (2008).
 N. Perea-Lopez, J. Tao, J.B. Talbot, J. McKittrick,  G.A. Hirata and S. P. DenBaars, “A Novel Hybrid Pulse Laser Deposition/ Metalorganic Vapour Deposition Method to Form Rare-earth Activated GaN,” J. Phys. D: Appl. Phys., 41, 122001 (2008).

References 

Living people
Year of birth missing (living people)
Penn State College of Engineering alumni
University of Minnesota College of Science and Engineering alumni
University of California, San Diego faculty
Oak Ridge National Laboratory people
American chemical engineers
20th-century women engineers
21st-century women engineers
Women chemical engineers
20th-century American chemists
21st-century American chemists
American women chemists
American women engineers
Presidents of the Electrochemical Society
20th-century American women scientists
21st-century American women scientists